The 1990–91 season was the 92nd season of competitive league football in the history of English football club Wolverhampton Wanderers. They played in the second tier of the English football system, the Football League Second Division. The team finished in 12th place after a poor run of form at the end of the season brought only two victories from the final fifteen matches.

This was the first season – of an eventual seventeen – for the club under the ownership of Sir Jack Hayward, who had purchased it in May 1990 for £2.1 million.

Results

Football League Second Division

A total of 24 teams competed in the Football League Second Division in the 1990–91 season. Each team played every other team twice: once at their stadium, and once at the opposition's. Three points were awarded to teams for each win, one point per draw, and none for defeats. 

Final table

Source: Statto.com

Results summary

Results by round

FA Cup

League Cup

Hull City won on away goals.

Full Members Cup

Players

|-
|align="left"|||align="left"|  ¤
|||0||0||0||0||0||0||0||||0||0||0||
|-
|align="left"|||align="left"|  ¤
|||0||0||0||0||0||0||0||||0||0||0||
|-
|align="left"|||align="left"| 
|39||0||1||0||2||0||2||0||44||0||0||0||
|-
|align="left"|||align="left"| 
|||0||||0||0||0||0||0||style="background:#98FB98"|||0||0||1||
|-
|align="left"|||align="left"| 
|26||3||1||0||2||0||2||0||31||3||0||0||
|-
|align="left"|||align="left"| 
|||0||0||0||0||0||0||0||||0||0||0||
|-
|align="left"|||align="left"| 
|40||2||1||0||2||0||||0||style="background:#98FB98"|||2||0||0||
|-
|align="left"|||align="left"| 
|||0||1||0||0||0||2||0||style="background:#98FB98"|||0||0||0||
|-
|align="left"|||style="background:#faecc8" align="left"|  ‡
|17||0||1||0||0||0||2||0||style="background:#98FB98"|20||0||0||0||
|-
|align="left"|||align="left"| 
|||3||1||0||2||0||2||0||||3||0||0||
|-
|align="left"|||align="left"| 
|||0||0||0||0||0||0||0||||0||0||0||
|-
|align="left"|||align="left"| 
|||1||0||0||2||0||0||0||||1||0||0||
|-
|align="left"|||align="left"| 
|||0||1||0||2||0||||0||||0||0||0||
|-
|align="left"|||align="left"| 
|20||2||0||0||0||0||0||0||style="background:#98FB98"|20||2||0||0||
|-
|align="left"|||style="background:#faecc8" align="left"|  ‡
|||0||0||0||0||0||0||0||style="background:#98FB98"|||0||0||0||
|-
|align="left"|||align="left"| 
|||0||0||0||0||0||0||0||style="background:#98FB98"|||0||0||0||
|-
|align="left"|||align="left"| 
|42||6||0||0||2||0||2||1||46||7||0||1||
|-
|align="left"|||align="left"| 
|||5||1||0||||0||2||0||||5||0||0||
|-
|align="left"|||align="left"| 
|31||1||0||0||2||0||2||0||35||1||0||0||
|-
|align="left"|||align="left"| 
|||0||0||0||0||0||0||0||||0||0||0||
|-
|align="left"|||align="left"| 
|||2||1||0||2||1||2||0||||3||0||0||
|-
|align="left"|||style="background:#faecc8" align="left"|  ‡
|||0||0||0||0||0||0||0||style="background:#98FB98"|||0||0||0||
|-
|align="left"|FW||align="left"| 
|43||26||1||0||2||0||2||1||48||27||0||0||
|-
|align="left"|FW||align="left"| 
|||0||0||0||||0||0||0||||0||0||0||
|-
|align="left"|FW||align="left"| 
|29||8||||0||0||0||0||0||||8||0||0||
|-
|align="left"|FW||align="left"| 
|||1||1||0||1||0||0||0||||1||0||0||
|-
|align="left"|FW||align="left"| 
|||2||0||0||||0||2||0||style="background:#98FB98"|||2||0||0||
|}
Source: Wolverhampton Wanderers: The Complete Record

Transfers

In

Out

Loans in

Loans out

Management and coaching staff

References

1990–91
Wolverhampton Wanderers